Guy Edward Hearn (September 6, 1888 – April 15, 1963) was an American actor who, in a forty-year film career, starting in 1915, played hundreds of roles, starting with juvenile leads, then, briefly, as leading man, all during the silent era.

With the arrival of sound, he became a character actor, appearing in scores of productions for virtually every studio, in which he was mostly unbilled, while those credits in which he was listed, reflected at least nine stage names, most frequently Edward Hearn, but also Guy E. Hearn, Ed Hearn, Eddie Hearn, Eddie Hearne, and Edward Hearne.

Leading man in silent films
Born in Dayton, Columbia County, Washington, He became an actor in his twenties, with a first known film credit listed in the 1915 short The Fool's Heart.

His initial feature was Her Bitter Cup in 1916, the year during which he was seen in sixteen shorts and features. 1917 was equally prolific for him, providing seventeen appearances. As short films gave way to features, the number of his annual productions decreased (four in 1918, four in 1919 and five in 1920), but he continued to work steadily, with film credits in every year of his career. He was third-billed in Faith, the 1920 production starring Peggy Hyland with J. Parks Jones, and had a supporting role that year in the serial, Daredevil Jack, a vehicle for boxing champion Jack Dempsey.

Engaged by Universal Pictures' early silent film subsidiary, Bluebird Photoplays, as leading man to Ruth Clifford in 1918's The Lure of Luxury, Hearn was subsequently put under contract with the low-budget studio Film Booking Offices of America (also known as FBO Pictures Corporation) and alternated between roles as leading man (to Ruth Renick in Tahiti-filmed The Fire Bride (1922), Jane Novak in Colleen of the Pines (1922), Gladys Walton The Town Scandal (1923), Laura La Plante Excitement (1924), and Josie Sedgwick in The Outlaw's Daughter (1925), and second leads, billed after Patsy Ruth Miller, Ralph Graves and Edna Murphy in Daughters of Today (1924).

In 1925, Hearn was fourth-billed as Clara Bow's brother in The Lawful Cheater, a crime drama fashioned as a vehicle for the flapper star, while he also had a rare first-billed role as the central character, Philip Nolan, in Fox Film Corporation's adaptation of Edward Everett Hale's classic short story, "The Man Without a Country". He was also top-billed in a minor 1924 western, The Devil's Partner, which not released until 1926, the year he was the human leading actor in a May vehicle for the dog star Peter the Great, a German Shepherd who, after appearing in one more film, was fatally shot in June.

In 1926, he was Helen Holmes' leading man in Perils of the Rail, while playing an unbilled cameo as a Union Army officer in another railroad-centered film, Buster Keaton's The General. In 1927, he was second-billed to Cornelius Keefe in Hook and Ladder No. 9, third-billed in the Larry Semon vehicle Spuds, the John Bowers–Anne Cornwall starrer The Heart of the Yukon and the Buffalo Bill, Jr. western series entry Pals in Peril, had lower-billed roles in four other films and played an unbilled bit in Cecil B. DeMille's The King of Kings.

Character actor during sound era
In 1928, as Hearn reached his fortieth birthday, his changing fortunes were reflected through the six productions in which he appeared. He was still briefly cast as a leading man, but only to German Shepherds. "The New Pathé Dog Star, Cyclone" in the Spencer Gordon Bennet-directed Pathé Exchange serial The Yellow Cameo, was first, with the film's poster highlighting only the names of leading lady Allene Ray and Cyclone, while FBO's feature film "Dog Justice", another vehicle for a German Shepherd (this dog's name was Ranger), came second. The other four titles, however, placed him between fifth and eighth in their cast lists.

In the last of his 1928 titles, also his first sound film, December-released Ned McCobb's Daughter, he was billed below Irene Rich, Theodore Roberts, Robert Armstrong and George Barraud, and directly above future star Carol (Carole) Lombard. As sound films began to make greater inroads at the start of 1929, Hearn's five films that year indicated a further downward spiral. He was second-billed (to Sam Nelson, who co-starred with Ranger in five other 1927–29 films) in another silent Ranger vehicle, The One Man Dog and third-billed (above Thelma Todd) in the William Collier, Jr.–Jacqueline Logan pairing for Columbia Pictures' part-talkie The Bachelor Girl.

In the remaining three titles, however, his billing was much lower. Frank Capra's first sound film, The Donovan Affair listed him eleventh and another talkie mystery, Universal's The Drake Case, a posthumous release for its star, Gladys Brockwell, listed him eighth. Both of these dialogue-laden productions, exist only in silent versions, following the loss of their sound discs. The last of Hearn's 1929 releases, the western Hell's Heroes, left him with a small unbilled role.

In 1930 Hearn had small supporting roles in three features and an unbilled part in a Charley Chase–Thelma Todd Hal Roach two-reeler, but it was 1931 that set the pattern for the remainder of his career. Forty-three years old in September of that year, he appeared in sixteen features and one short, with nine of those roles being unbilled. For each year, until 1945, he had an uninterrupted run of credits, most of them unbilled. Returning to film work in 1950, he again accumulated numerous credits until the end of 1953. His final two credits, both unbilled, were in 1955's This Island Earth and Tall Man Riding. His television work was limited to a 1952 episode of Cowboy G-Men and a 1953 episode of The Lone Ranger, both of which were early TV series aimed at a juvenile audience.

Personal life
Eight years after his 1955 retirement, Guy Edward Hearn died in Los Angeles County at the age of 74. He was married to French Canadian Tryda Saindon from the mid-1910s until at least June 1930, as indicated in that year's decennial census. They were the parents of one child, Edward, born in Los Angeles during summer of 1916.

Filmography

 Her Bitter Cup (1916) as Walter Burke
 The Whirlpool of Destiny (1916) as Davidson
 The Double Room Mystery (1917) as Silver Joe
 Her Soul's Inspiration (1917) as Silent Bob
 Treason (1917) as Danick Rysson
 The Man from Tia Juana as Larry Kerwin(*uncredited)
 The Lost Express (1917) as Francis Murphy
 Lawless Love (1918) as Freddie Montgomery
 The Mask (1918) as Sam Joplin
 The Lure of Luxury (1918) as John Coventry
 The Light of Western Stars (1918) as Al Hammond
 Whom the Gods Would Destroy (1919)
 Jacques of the Silver North (1919) as Warren Sherman
 Over the Garden Wall (1919) as Stanley Davis
 Daredevil Jack (1920) as Cyril Dennison
 Faith (1920) as Dr. George Kyle
 Into the Light (1920) as The Boy
 Down Home (1920) as Chet Todd
 The Coast of Opportunity (1920) as Tommy De Boer
 The Avenging Arrow (1921) as Ralph Troy
 All Dolled Up (1921) as James Montgomery Johnson
 Keeping Up with Lizzie (1921) as Dan Pettigrew
 The Face of the World (1921) as Harold Mark
 The Honor of Rameriz (1921, Short) as The Thief
 The Spirit of the Lake (1921, Short)
 The Fire Bride (1922) as Steve Maitland
 A Question of Honor (1922) as Bill Shannon
 The Truthful Liar (1922) as David Haggard
 The Glory of Clementina (1922) as Tommy Burgrave
 Her Night of Nights (1922) as Jerry Trimble
 Colleen of the Pines (1922) as Barry O'Neil
 The Flirt (1922) as Richard Lindley
 Mind Over Motor (1923) as Starter
 The Love Letter (1923) as Bill Carter
 The Town Scandal (1923) as Toby Caswell
 The Miracle Baby (1923) as Hal Norton
 Daytime Wives (1923) as Ben Branscom
 Daughters of Today (1924) as Peter Farnham
 When a Man's a Man (1924) as Stanley Manning
 Excitement (1924) as Arthur Drew
 The Dangerous Blonde (1924) as Royall Randall
 The Turmoil (1924) as Roscoe Sheridan
 Winner Take All (1924) as Jack Hamilton
 As No Man Has Loved (1925) as Lt. Philip Nolan
 The Lawful Cheater (1925) as Roy Burns
 Perils of the Rail (1925) as Jack Hathaway
 The Outlaw's Daughter (1925) as Jim King
 One of the Bravest (1925) as Dan Kelly
 Daring Days (1925) as Catamount
 The Devil's Partner (1926) as Glen Wilson
 Daniel Boone Thru the Wilderness (1926) as The Stranger
 The Still Alarm (1926) as Tom Brand
 The Sign of the Claw (1926) as Robert Conway
 With Davy Crockett at the Fall of the Alamo (1926) as Fred Warren
 The General (1926) as Union Officer (uncredited)
 Winners of the Wilderness (1927) as Gen. George Washington
 Spuds (1927) as Captain Arthur
 The King of Kings (1927) (uncredited)
 The Heart of the Yukon (1927) as Jack Waite
 Pals in Peril (1927) as Blackie Burns
 The Hero on Horseback (1927) as Harvey Grey
 The Harvester (1927) as Dr. Harmon
 Hook and Ladder No. 9 (1927) as Dan Duffy
 Hot Heels (1927) as Gambler
 The Desert Pirate (1927) as Norton
 The Yellow Cameo (1928) as Terry Lawton
 Dog Justice (1928) as Jimmie O'Neil
 The Fightin' Redhead (1928) as Jim Dalton
 The Big Hop (1928) as Pilot
 Ned McCobb's Daughter (1928) as Butterworth
 The One Man Dog (1929) as Pierre
 The Donovan Affair (1929) as Nelson
 The Bachelor Girl (1929) as Campbell
 The Drake Case (1929) as Edmonds / Butler
 Hell's Heroes (1929) as Frank Edwards (uncredited)
 Hide-Out (1930) as Coach Latham
 The Spoilers (1930) as Lieutenant
 Reno (1930) as Tom Hodge
 One Night at Susie's (1930) as Policeman (uncredited)
 The Painted Desert (1931) as Tex
 Dirigible (1931) as Admiral's Aide (uncredited)
 The Avenger (1931) as Captain Paul Lake
 Clearing the Range (1931) as Jim Fremont
 Ladies' Man (1931) as Maitre D' (uncredited)
 The Texas Ranger (1931) as Texas Ranger Capt. Edwards (uncredited)
 Up for Murder (1931) as Policeman (uncredited)
 The Vanishing Legion (1931) as Jed Williams
 A Son of the Plains (1931) as Buck Brokaw
 Smart Money (1931) as Reporter (uncredited)
 Ex-Bad Boy (1931) as Assistant Manager (uncredited)
 Broadminded (1931) as Man at Fire Escape Window (uncredited)
 Bad Girl (1931) as Male Nurse (uncredited)
 The Galloping Ghost (1931, Serial) as Clay College Coach Harlow
 Local Boy Makes Good (1931) as Relay Caller (uncredited)
 The Cheyenne Cyclone (1931) as J.C. 'Flash' Corbin
 Emma (1932) as Haskins' Assistant (uncredited)
 The Rainbow Trail (1932) as Jim Lassiter (uncredited)
 The Sunset Trail (1932) as Bank Teller (uncredited)
 The Local Bad Man (1932) as Ben Murdock
 The Shadow of the Eagle (1932, Serial) as Col. Nathan Gregory
 The Texas Tornado (1932) as Fanner Durkin
 State's Attorney (1932) as Court Reporter (uncredited)
 The Last of the Mohicans (1932, Serial) as Col. Munro
 Unashamed (1932) as Mr. Ogden's Secretary (uncredited)
 Ann Carver's Profession (1933) as Dinner Party Guest (uncredited)
 Fighting with Kit Carson (1933) as Henchman Morgan
 Her First Mate (1933) as Ferry Captain (uncredited)
 Penthouse (1933) as Detective (uncredited)
 Golden Harvest (1933) as Pierce (uncredited)
 I'm No Angel (1933) as Court Clerk (uncredited)
 Eskimo (1933) as Captain's Mate (uncredited)
 Roman Scandals (1933) as Roman Citizen (uncredited)
 Son of a Sailor (1933) as Admiral (uncredited)
 The Mystery Squadron (1933, Serial) as Sheriff [Chs. 2-3, 12]
 Fugitive Lovers (1934) as Detective (uncredited)
 Cross Country Cruise (1934) as Bus Passenger (uncredited)
 The Show-Off (1934) as Automobile Attendant (uncredited)
 Stolen Sweets (1934) as Ship's Captain (uncredited)
 Monte Carlo Nights (1934) as Detective (uncredited)
 The Thin Man (1934) as Detective (uncredited)
 Burn 'Em Up Barnes (1934, Serial) as Henchman Parker [Chs. 2-5] (uncredited)
 Whom the Gods Destroy (1934) as Balkan Passenger (uncredited)
 Fighting Hero (1934) as Bert Hawley
 Paris Interlude (1934) as Reporter (uncredited)
 The Cat's-Paw (1934) as Radio Listener (uncredited)
 The Count of Monte Cristo (1934) as Signalman (uncredited)
 Fighting Through (1934) as Lennie Lenihan
 The Law of the Wild (1934, Serial) as Spectator (uncredited)
 King Kelly of the U.S.A. (1934) as Mop Salesman (uncredited)
 Young and Beautiful (1934) as Movie Director (uncredited)
 Belle of the Nineties (1934) as Croupier (uncredited)
 Wake Up and Dream (1934) as Reporter (uncredited)
 Lady by Choice (1934) as Detective (uncredited)
 Against the Law (1934) as Fireman (uncredited)
 In Old Santa Fe (1934) as Tracy Henchman (uncredited)
 Jealousy (1934) as Cop (uncredited)
 Flirting with Danger (1934) as San Rico Plant Supervisor
 Mystery Mountain (1934, Serial) as Lake
 Sing Sing Nights (1934) as Governor's Aide (uncredited)
 Forsaking All Others (1934) as Party Guest (uncredited)
 The Whole Town's Talking (1935) as Policeman Announcing Carpenter (uncredited)
 Naughty Marietta (1935) as Mercenary Scout (uncredited)
 Behind the Green Lights (1935) as Detective Brewster
 The Miracle Rider (1935) as Emil Janss
 The Headline Woman (1935) as Headwaiter (uncredited)
 Let 'Em Have It (1935) as Desk Sergeant (uncredited)
 Public Hero No. 1 (1935) as Policeman in Pursuing Car (uncredited)
 Ladies Crave Excitement (1935) as Guard (uncredited)
 Westward Ho (1935) as Townsman (uncredited)
 Page Miss Glory (1935) as Detective (uncredited)
 Diamond Jim (1935) as Job Applicant (uncredited)
 Tumbling Tumbleweeds (1935) as Barney Craven
 Red Salute (1935) as Border Patrolman (uncredited)
 Streamline Express (1935) as Mack - Purser
 Hot Off the Press (1935)
 Confidential (1935) as Insp. Stone
 The Rainmakers (1935) as Farmer (uncredited)
 A Tale of Two Cities (1935) as Leader at Bastille (uncredited)
 Bulldog Courage (1935) as Clayton - Henchman
 The Mysterious Avenger (1936) as Cattleman (uncredited)
 Black Gold (1936) as Oilman Lease Holder (uncredited)
 The Bridge of Sighs (1936) as Police Clerk (uncredited)
 The Lawless Nineties (1936) as Townsman (uncredited)
 The Leathernecks Have Landed (1936) as Marine Officer (uncredited)
 The Preview Murder Mystery (1936) as Officer (uncredited)
 Red River Valley (1936) as Sheriff Ed
 King of the Pecos (1936) as Eli Jackson
 Silly Billies (1936) as Mark - Martin's Brother (uncredited)
 Moonlight Murder (1936) as Police Surgeon (uncredited)
 Avenging Waters (1936) as Foreman Jim (uncredited)
 The Three Wise Guys (1936) as Cop
 The Cattle Thief (1936) as Chet (uncredited)
 Easy Money (1936) as Cop (uncredited)
 San Francisco (1936) as Parishioner (uncredited)
 High Tension (1936) as Businessman (uncredited)
 His Brother's Wife (1936) as Laboratory Technician (uncredited)
 Missing Girls (1936) as Police Officer
 Lady Luck (1936) as Bill - a Cop (uncredited)
 The Unknown Ranger (1936) as Jim Wright
 Ride 'Em Cowboy (1936) as Man at Dance (uncredited)
 The President's Mystery (1936) as Meeting Moderator (uncredited)
 I Cover Chinatown (1936) as Herbert - Tourist Husband (uncredited)
 15 Maiden Lane (1936) as Detective Thomas (uncredited)
 The Man I Marry (1936) as Chauffuer (uncredited)
 Mad Holiday (1936) as Policeman (uncredited)
 The Big Show (1936) as Studio Man (uncredited)
 The Accusing Finger (1936) as Bailiff (uncredited)
 The Boss Rider of Gun Creek (1936) as Mal MacGregor
 The Mighty Treve (1937) as Second Dog Show Judge
 The Devil's Playground (1937) as Surgeon (uncredited)
 Sandflow (1937) as Liveryman (uncredited)
 Penrod and Sam (1937) as 2nd G-Man (uncredited)
 A Star Is Born (1937) as Sanitarium Attendant (uncredited)
 Anything for a Thrill (1937) as Collins
 It Can't Last Forever (1937) as Federal Man (uncredited)
 Exclusive (1937) as Policeman (uncredited)
 Souls at Sea (1937) as Courtroom Spectator (uncredited)
 Bad Guy (1937) as Policeman Driving Kitty (uncredited)
 It Happened in Hollywood (1937) as Cop (uncredited)
 Something to Sing About (1937) as Studio Guard (uncredited)
 Life Begins with Love (1937) as Detective (uncredited)
 Ali Baba Goes to Town (1937) as Sentry (uncredited)
 Trouble at Midnight (1937) as DeHoff
 The Old Wyoming Trail (1937) as Hammond
 Springtime in the Rockies (1937) as Jed Thorpe
 Paid to Dance (1937) as Butler
 Headin' East (1937) as Rancher (uncredited)
 The Shadow (1937) as Circus Doctor
 Man-Proof (1938) as Ticket Man (uncredited)
 My Old Kentucky Home (1938) (uncredited)
 Penitentiary (1938) as Prison Guard with Telegram (uncredited)
 Assassin of Youth (1938) as Doctor (uncredited)
 Go Chase Yourself (1938) as Jack - Raffle Seller in Bank (uncredited)
 International Crime (1938) as Policeman (uncredited)
 Professor Beware (1938) as Cop (uncredited)
 The Main Event (1938) as Detective (uncredited)
 Young Fugitives (1938) as Legion Commander (uncredited)
 The Great Adventures of Wild Bill Hickok (1938, Serial) as Tom Stedman (Ch's 14-15) (uncredited)
 Fast Company (1938) as Policeman (uncredited)
 You Can't Take It with You (1938) as Court Attendant (uncredited)
 Boys Town (1938) as Train Guard (uncredited)
 Juvenile Court (1938) as Cop in PAL Office (uncredited)
 West of the Santa Fe (1938) as Crane
 The Spider's Web (1938, Serial) as Police Desk Sergeant (uncredited)
 Red Barry (1938, serial) as Detective O'Hara (uncredited)
 Gang Bullets (1938) as Detective Craig (uncredited)
 Sweethearts (1938) as Party Guest (uncredited)
 Stand Up and Fight (1939) as Joe (uncredited)
 The Lone Wolf Spy Hunt (1939) as Precinct Night Sergeant (uncredited)
 St. Louis Blues (1939) as Actor (uncredited)
 Texas Stampede (1939) as Owens
 Rollin' Westward (1939) as Poker Player (uncredited)
 I Was a Convict (1939) as McGee, a Guard (uncredited)
 Sergeant Madden (1939) as Guard in Jail (uncredited)
 Let Us Live (1939) as Detective Carson (uncredited)
 Broadway Serenade (1939) as Frank (uncredited)
 Union Pacific (1939) as Sergeant (uncredited)
 Man of Conquest (1939) as Minor Role (uncredited)
 Western Caravans (1939) as Rancher (uncredited)
 Dick Tracy's G-Men (1939) as Forest Ranger (uncredited)
 Thunder Afloat (1939) as Fisherman (uncredited)
 Fast and Furious (1939) as Turnkey (uncredited)
 Smashing the Money Ring (1939) as Guard Muldoon (uncredited)
 Bad Little Angel (1939) as Fireman (uncredited)
 Another Thin Man (1939) as Detective (uncredited)
 The Stranger from Texas (1939) as Marshal Ritchie (uncredited)
 Nick Carter, Master Detective (1939) as Deputy (uncredited)
 Wolf of New York (1940) as Cop (uncredited)
 Chasing Trouble (1940) as Callahan's Boss (uncredited)
 My Little Chickadee (1940) as Barfly Drinking Panther (uncredited)
 The Man from Dakota (1940) as Confederate Captain (uncredited)
 The Ghost Comes Home (1940) as Townsman at Banquet (uncredited)
 Son of the Navy (1940) as Desk Sgt. Flaherty (uncredited)
 Dark Command (1940) as Jury Foreman (uncredited)
 Two Girls on Broadway (1940) as Doorman (uncredited)
 Covered Wagon Days (1940) as Captain Hudson (uncredited)
 Edison, the Man (1940) as Broker (uncredited)
 Gangs of Chicago (1940) as Policeman at Crime Scene (uncredited)
 Florian (1940) as Policeman (uncredited)
 Phantom Raiders (1940) as Officer on the Orchid (uncredited)
 New Moon (1940) as Bondsman (uncredited)
 Adventures of Red Ryder (1940, Serial) as Colonel Lang [Ch. 1] (uncredited)
 Sporting Blood (1940) as Bank Guard (uncredited)
 We Who Are Young (1940) as Turnkey (uncredited)
 Deadwood Dick (1940, Serial) as Tom Sharp (uncredited)
 I Love You Again (1940) as Observer of Man Overboard (uncredited)
 Sky Murder (1940) as Man in Monrose's Office (uncredited)
 The Green Archer as Cop (uncredited)
 Little Nellie Kelly (1940) as Second Court Clerk (uncredited)
 Remedy for Riches (1940) as Police Patrolman-Driver (uncredited)
 Go West (1940) as Man at Saloon Door (uncredited)
 Santa Fe Trail (1940) as Abolitionist in Armory (uncredited)
 The Green Hornet Strikes Again! (1940, Serial) as Patrol Cop (uncredited)
 The Wild Man of Borneo (1941) (scenes deleted)
 White Eagle (1941, Serial) as Mr. Gardner (uncredited)
 Meet John Doe (1941) as Mayor's Secretary (uncredited)
 Love Crazy (1941) as Policeman (uncredited)
 The Get-Away (1941) as Policeman Outside Dance Hall (uncredited)
 Caught in the Draft (1941) as Operation Manager (uncredited)
 Blossoms in the Dust (1941) as Mill Worker (uncredited)
 Lady Be Good (1941) as Bailiff (uncredited)
 Honky Tonk (1941) as Poker Player on Train (uncredited)
 Holt of the Secret Service (1941) as Agent Jim Layton
 Shadow of the Thin Man (1941) as Policeman in Molly's Office (uncredited)
 Unholy Partners (1941) as Newspaperman Listening to Teletype Report (uncredited)
 Sullivan's Travels (1941) as Policeman at Beverly Hills Station (uncredited)
 Steel Against the Sky (1941) as Minor Role (scenes deleted)
 Dick Tracy vs. Crime, Inc. (1941, Serial) as Cutter Captain (uncredited)
 Pacific Blackout (1941) as Sergeant (uncredited)
 Don Winslow of the Navy (1942, Serial) as Mill Henchman [Chs. 5-6] (uncredited)
 Nazi Agent (1942) as Reporter (uncredited)
 The Vanishing Virginian (1942) as Juror (uncredited)
 Dr. Kildare's Victory (1942) as Accident Bystander (uncredited)
 Klondike Fury (1942) as Medical Board Member (uncredited)
 My Favorite Blonde (1942) as Train Official (uncredited)
 I Was Framed (1942) as Policeman (uncredited)
 Kid Glove Killer (1942) as Truck Driver Eating at Eddire's (uncredited)
 Fingers at the Window (1942) as Citizen (uncredited)
 Mokey (1942) as Policeman (uncredited)
 Dr. Broadway (1942) as Jim - Policeman (uncredited)
 Jackass Mail (1942) as Miner (uncredited)
 Sabotage Squad (1942) as Foreman (uncredited)
 Cairo (1942) as Cavity Rock Townsman / Egyptian with Trampolines (uncredited)
 The Talk of the Town (1942) as Sergeant (uncredited)
 Baby Face Morgan (1942) as Payoff Victim in Montage (uncredited)
 The Omaha Trail (1942) as Man without Oxen to Sell (uncredited)
 Northwest Rangers (1942) as Gambler (uncredited)
 Journey for Margaret (1942) as Air-Raid Warden at Fire (uncredited)
 Air Raid Wardens (1943) as Plant Watchman (uncredited)
 A Stranger in Town (1943) as Courtroom Spectator (uncredited)
 The Desperadoes (1943) as Armed Townsman (uncredited)
 Swing Shift Maisie (1943) as Plant Guard (uncredited)
 Lost Angel (1943) as Reporter (uncredited)
 Shine On, Harvest Moon (1944) as Disturbed Patron (uncredited)
 And the Angels Sing (1944) as Squad Car Policeman (uncredited)
 An American Romance (1944) as Mill Gateman (uncredited)
 The Great Flamarion (1945) as Vagrant on Park Bench (uncredited)
 Saratoga Trunk (1945) as Man with Lantern (uncredited)
 The Great Jewel Robber (1950) as Canadian Desk Sergeant (uncredited)
 Atom Man vs. Superman (1950, Serial) as Prof. Stone [Chs. 3-4] (uncredited)
 Storm Warning (1951) as Mr. Rainey (uncredited)
 Sugarfoot (1951) as Auction Merchant (uncredited)
 Raton Pass (1951) as Treadwell - Lawyer (uncredited)
 Lightning Strikes Twice (1951) as Hank (uncredited)
 Strangers on a Train (1951) as Lt. Campbell (uncredited)
 Tomorrow Is Another Day (1951) as Prison Guard (uncredited)
 Pistol Harvest (1951) as Terry Moran
 Road Agent (1952) as Sheriff Quillin
 Carson City (1952) as Sheriff (uncredited)
 The Kid from Broken Gun (1952) as Jury Foreman (uncredited)
 My Man and I (1952) as Deputy (uncredited)
 Springfield Rifle (1952) as Calhoun (uncredited)
 The Man Behind the Gun (1953) as Maj. Nichols (uncredited)
 Count the Hours (1953) as Howard Combes (uncredited)
 Port Sinister (1953) as Capt. Crawley
 Powder River (1953) as Man on Horse (uncredited)
 Conquest of Cochise (1953) as Gen. Gadsden (uncredited)
 Three Sailors and a Girl (1953) as Workman (uncredited)
 This Island Earth (1955) as Reporter (uncredited)
 Tall Man Riding (1955) as Townsman (uncredited)

References

External links

1888 births
1963 deaths
American male film actors
American male silent film actors
20th-century American male actors
People from Dayton, Washington